Somerset County Council in England is elected every four years. Since the last boundary changes in 2001, 58 councillors have been elected from 58 wards.

Political control
Since 1973 political control of the council has been held by the following parties:

Leadership
The leaders of the council since 2001 have been:

Council elections
 1973 Somerset County Council election
 1977 Somerset County Council election
 1981 Somerset County Council election (boundary changes)
 1985 Somerset County Council election
 1989 Somerset County Council election
 1993 Somerset County Council election
 1997 Somerset County Council election
 2001 Somerset County Council election (boundary changes increased the number of seats by one)
 2005 Somerset County Council election
 2009 Somerset County Council election
 2013 Somerset County Council election
 2017 Somerset County Council election

County result maps

By-election results

1997-2001

2005-2009

2009–2013

2013–2017

References

By-election results

External links
Somerset County Council

 
Politics of Somerset
County council elections in England
Council elections in Somerset